Microbicides Development Programme is an organisation based in London which promotes the study of microbicides for sexually transmitted diseases.

Oversight
The Microbicides Development Programme is funded by the Department for International Development through the Medical Research Council.  The organisation is coordinated MRC Clinical Trials Unit and the Imperial College London at St Mary's Hospital. The organisation was founded on 25 January 2006.

PRO 2000

The MDP conducting testing of the microbicide gel PRO 2000 in sub-Saharan Africa starting in 2005.

References

External links

Microbicides
Organisations associated with Imperial College London
Organizations established in 1996
Medical and health organisations based in London
1996 establishments in the United Kingdom